A Bullet for Joey is a 1955 film noir directed by  Lewis Allen and starring Edward G. Robinson and George Raft. The picture involves a gangster who sneaks into Canada to kidnap a scientist for the communists. The supporting cast features  Audrey Totter, Peter van Eyck, George Dolenz, and Peter Hansen.

Plot
Communist agents in Canada are spying on Dr. Carl Macklin, an atomic physicist whose knowledge they want. To kidnap him, Eric Hartman, the party's top man in Montreal, offers $100,000 to a deported American criminal, Joe Victor.

Joe's former flame, Joyce Geary, is blackmailed into helping with the plan. Police Inspector Leduc of the Royal Canadian Mounted Police investigates and ends up caring for Joyce, as she does for him.

A thug working for Victor kills the scientist's secretary after using her to gain information. Leduc is taken prisoner aboard a ship as Hartman and Victor attempt to take Dr. Macklin with them to Europe.

A plea is made by Leduc to the gangster Victor, who misses his native America, to do the right thing for a change and help stop the Communists. A shootout ensues between Victor and Hartman, who end up killing one another, but Joyce's innocence is proven to the satisfaction of Leduc and the law.

Cast
 Edward G. Robinson as Inspector Leduc
 George Raft as Joe Victor
 Audrey Totter as Joyce
 Peter van Eyck as Hartman
 George Dolenz as Macklin
 Peter Hansen as Fred

Production
The film was originally entitled Canada's Great Manhunt. It was inspired by a magazine article by Stephen Brott. This was turned into a story by James Benson Nablo which was optioned by Sam Bischoff, who had owned a production company with George Raft in the late 1940s, and David Diamond. Geoffrey Homes wrote the script and George Raft and Edward G Robinson were signed to play the leads. Gloria Grahame was sought to play the female lead. Robinson and Raft had starred in a previous film together 14 years earlier, Raoul Walsh's Manpower with Marlene Dietrich.

Filming started 10 December 1954. Robinson was greylisted at the time. He paid Bezzerides $5,000 to polish Robinson's dialogue. When Raft found out about this, Raft paid the writer to perform the same function for him.

Release
A Bullet for Joey was released in theatres in New York City on April 15, 1955. The film was released in London at the Exhibitors' Trade Show on April 7, 1955, and in Australia on March 16, 1956. A Bullet for Joey was released on Blu-ray in November 2015, and DVD by Kino Lorber Studio Classics on July 10, 2007, and November 17, 2015.

Reception

Critical response
The Los Angeles Times called the film "moderately exciting".

In his book, Film Noir, Detective and Mystery Movies on DVD, John Howard Reid considered the movie dull. Slow pace, one-dimensional characters, and an unconvincing climax plague the film.

Film critic Bosley Crowther wrote in his review: "AGE cannot wither nor custom stale the infinite uniformity of Edward G. Robinson and George Raft. In A Bullet for Joey, a crime drama that came to the Palace yesterday, along with the vaudeville program, Mr. Raft solemnly appears as an outcast American gangster called back into service to do a job of kidnapping a key atomic scientist out of Canada for a "foreign power." And Mr. Robinson plays a cool inspector of the Royal Canadian Mounted Police who is assigned to uncover the suspected connivance and nip it in the bud. Considerately, we need not scan the details of Mr. Raft's laying out the job and Mr. Robinson's patient checking on him every step of the way. These are things that Mr. Raft and Mr. Robinson can act with their eyes shut—and sometimes do. (We suspect, in this instance, that the director, Lewis Allen, had his eyes shut, too.)"

Box office
The film was a box office flop.

See also
List of American films of 1955

References

Sources

External links
 
 

Review of film at Cinema Retro
Review of film at Variety

1955 films
1950s English-language films
American crime drama films
American black-and-white films
Cold War spy films
American anti-communist propaganda films
Film noir
United Artists films
Films directed by Lewis Allen
Films scored by Harry Sukman
Films set in Montreal
Films shot in California
1955 crime drama films
1950s thriller films
1950s American films